War pigs are pigs speculated to have been used, rarely at most, in ancient warfare as a countermeasure to war elephants.

War pigs may also refer to:
"War Pigs", a song by Black Sabbath from their 1970 album Paranoid
Warpig (band), a Canadian band
Warpigs (band), a Hungarian band
War Pigs (film), a 2015 war film
Das Kampfschwein (The War Pig), nickname in English for Marc Wilmots
Hogs of War (known as Fronteschweine in German), a PlayStation game featuring the voice of Rik Mayall

See also
Pig War (disambiguation)